Malakh Darreh-ye Sofla (also Romanized as Malakh Darreh-ye Soflá; also known as Malakh Darreh) is a village in Firuzeh Rural District, in the Central District of Firuzeh County, Razavi Khorasan Province, Iran. At the 2006 census, its population was 171, in 52 families.

References 

Populated places in Firuzeh County